The Arizona Army National Guard is a component of the United States Army and the United States National Guard. National coordination of various state National Guard units are maintained through the National Guard Bureau.

Arizona Army National Guard units are trained and equipped as part of the United States Army. The same ranks and insignia are used and National Guardsmen are eligible to receive all United States military awards. The Arizona National Guard also bestows a number of state awards for local services rendered in or to the state of Arizona.

Currently, there are over 5,000 soldiers serving in the Arizona Army Guard.

History
In response to the Indian wars, the Arizona Army National Guard was formed on September 2, 1865. In 1898, hundreds of Arizonans joined the ranks of the Rough Riders during the Spanish–American War. The Militia Act of 1903 organized the various state militias into the present National Guard system.

Since then, the Arizona Army National Guard has been deployed to Korea, Vietnam, Iraq, and Afghanistan. Units from Arizona also deployed to Louisiana to assist with the Hurricane Katrina aftermath.

The 158th Infantry Regiment was created September 2, 1865, as the First Arizona Volunteer Infantry. Subsequent to Pancho Villa's murder of American civilians and soldiers in Columbus, New Mexico in 1916, the 1st Arizona Infantry was activated and headquartered at Camp Naco, Arizona and assigned border protection duties.

The regiment was drafted into Federal Service for World War I, 5 August 1917 as part of the 40th Infantry Division. Reorganization after the 1st World War assigned the 158th Infantry to the 45th Infantry Division. On 16 September 1940, the declaration of the National Emergency, the 158th Infantry joined its parent organization, the 45th Division at Fort Sill, Oklahoma. After being relieved by divisions in campaign after campaign across the Pacific, the 158th Infantry was selected to spearhead the final invasion of Japan.

Units from Arizona were called into action on September 26, 1940. The 158th Regimental Combat Team were given the name the "Bushmasters," named after the deadly Bushmaster snake in Panama. General Douglas MacArthur said, "No greater fighting combat team has ever deployed for battle."

The 158th Infantry was demobilized and returned to state service following the end of World War II. It was redesignated in June 1967 as the 258th Infantry Brigade. It was subsequently reorganized and redesignated in August 1968 as the 258th Military Police Brigade. In August 1976 the unit was reorganized and redesignated as the 258th Support Center, later the 258th Rear Area Operations Center. The Cannon Company, 158th Infantry was reorganized as the 153d Field Artillery Brigade (including units of the 180th Field Artillery Regiment). The 153d FA Brigade was reorganized and redesignated as the 98th Troop command in 2006. In September 2010 the unit was reorganized and redesignated as the 158th Maneuver Enhanced Brigade. The 1st Battalion, 180th Field Artillery Regiment was reorganized and redesignated in 2006 as the 1st Battalion, 158th Infantry Regiment and assigned as an element of the 29th Infantry Brigade Combat Team (HI ARNG).

The official national motto of the Army National Guard is "Always Ready, Always There". Like the majority of all 54 states and territories, the Arizona Army National Guard has its own official motto "Protecting What Matters".

Duties

National Guard units can be mobilized at any time by presidential order to supplement regular armed forces, and upon declaration of a state of emergency by the governor of the state in which they serve. Unlike Army Reserve troops, Arizona Army National Guard  Soldiers cannot be mobilized individually (except through voluntary transfers or approved temporary duty assignments), but only as part of their respective units.

Active duty callups
For much of the final decades of the twentieth century, National Guard personnel typically served "One weekend a month, two weeks a year", with a portion working for the Guard in a full-time capacity.  The current forces formation plans of the US Army call for the typical National Guard unit (or National Guardsman) to serve one year of active duty for every three years of service.  More specifically, current Department of Defense policy is that no Guardsman will be involuntarily activated for a total of more than 24 months (cumulative) in one six-year enlistment period (this policy is due to change 1 August 2007, the new policy states that soldiers will be given 24 months between deployments of no more than 24 months, individual states have differing policies).

Units

 Arizona National Guard Recruiting, 1000 E University Dr. Tempe, AZ 85281 
 Headquarters and Headquarters Company (HHC), Camp Navajo, AZ
 98th Aviation Troop Command (Silverbell Army Heliport)
 1st Battalion (Attack Reconnaissance ), 285th Aviation Regiment
 2nd Battalion (Assault Helicopter), 285th Aviation Regiment
 158th Maneuver Enhancement Brigade (Papago Park Military Reservation (PPMR))
 253rd Engineer Battalion
 Headquarters and Headquarters Company (HHC)
 850th Military Police Battalion
 855th Military Police Company, Phoenix, AZ with det at Yuma, AZ
 856th Military Police Company, Camp Navajo, AZ
 860th Military Police Company, Tucson, AZ
 1st Battalion, 158th Infantry Regiment
 Headquarters and Headquarters Company (HHC)
 Company A
 Company B
 Company C
 Company D
 Company G
 Detachment 1 (FIST), HHB, 1st Battalion, 487th Field Artillery Regiment
 153rd Brigade Support Battalion
 198th Regional Support Group (Papago Park Military Reservation)
 819th Engineer Company (Sapper)
 158th Combat Sustainment Support Battalion (158th CSSB) (Stofft Armory)
 108th Army Band (PPMR)
 123rd Mobile Public Affairs (Petty Crew Armory, PPMR)
 159th Finance Management Support Detachment (Petty Crew Armory, PPMR)
 160th Finance Management Support Detachment (Petty Crew Armory, PPMR)
 363rd Explosive Ordnance Disposal Company (Coolidge, AZ)
 996th Area Support Medical Company (Tempe, AZ)
 3666th Support Maintenance Company (Petty Crew Armory, PPMR) 
 1120th Transportation Battalion (Glendale, AZ)
 222nd Transportation Company (Florence Military Reservation)
 1404th Transportation Company (Bellemont, AZ with det at Show Low, AZ)
 2220th Transportation Company (Tucson, AZ with det at Douglas, AZ)
 Company A, 422nd Expeditionary Signal Battalion (Phoenix, AZ)

Other

 215th Regiment (Regional Training Institute)
 258th Rear Area Operations Center (deployed to OIF 5)
 91st Civil Support Team (WMD)
 194th Engineer Detachment (Fire fighter)
 257th Engineer Detachment (Well Drilling)
 258th Engineer Company (Horizontal)
 259th Engineer Platoon (Quarry)
 260th Engineer Detachment (Fire Fighter)
 5th Battalion (Air Ambulance), 159th Aviation Regiment
 Recon Air Interdiction Detachment (RAID)
 Army Aviation Support Facility #1
 Western ARNG Aviation Training Site (WAATS)

See also
 State defense force
 Militia
 Camp Naco, Arizona
 List of armored and cavalry regiments of the United States Army

References

External links
 Arizona National Guard site
 GlobalSecurity.org Army National Guard page
 Cuidado at army.mil

United States Army National Guard by state
Military in Arizona
1865 establishments in Arizona Territory